Andy Murray was the defending champion, but this year he decided to participate in the Cologne event instead, where he later withdrew due to hip injury.

Ugo Humbert won the title, defeating Alex de Minaur in the final, 6–1, 7–6(7–4).

Seeds
The top four seeds receive a bye into the second round.

Draw

Finals

Top half

Bottom half

Qualifying

Seeds

Qualifiers

Lucky loser

Qualifying draw

First qualifier

Second qualifier

Third qualifier

Fourth qualifier

References

External links
 Main Draw
 Qualifying Draw

2020 ATP Tour
2020 Singles